Goodman–Stark House, also known as the Stark–Unsell House, is a historic home located at Louisiana, Pike County, Missouri. It was built about 1894, and is a -story, Queen Anne style brick dwelling.  It has a steeply pitched hipped and gabled roof with intersecting ridges and a front-facing gable, prominent masonry chimneys and an asymmetrical facade with bay windows and balustraded porches.

It was listed on the National Register of Historic Places in 1994.

References

Houses on the National Register of Historic Places in Missouri
Queen Anne architecture in Missouri
Houses completed in 1894
Buildings and structures in Pike County, Missouri
National Register of Historic Places in Pike County, Missouri